Marjoram is a somewhat cold-sensitive perennial herb.

Marjoram may also refer to:

 Kahlua/Tequila Marjoram, a character in the game and anime Galaxy Angel
 Pot marjoram, a common name for Origanum onites
Adam Marjoram (born 1993), an Australian racing driver